The median triangle of a given (reference) triangle is a triangle, the sides of which are equal and parallel to the medians of its reference triangle.

References 
Roger A. Johnson: Advanced Euclidean Geometry. Dover 2007, pp. 282–283
Claudi Alsina, Roger B. Nelsen: Charming Proofs: A Journey Into Elegant Mathematics. MAA, 2010, p. 165
Árpad Bényi, Branko Ćurgus: "Outer Median Triangles". In: Mathematics Magazine, Vol. 87, No. 3 (June 2014), pp. 185–194 (JSTOR)

External links 

Objects defined for a triangle